Mario Teodoro Failon Etong (born March 29, 1962), popularly known as Ted Failon, is a multi-awarded Filipino broadcast journalist both on radio and television. He also served as a representative of the 1st district of Leyte from 2001 to 2004.

A broadcast journalist previously for ABS-CBN, he previously presented news for Radyo Patrol Balita Alas-Siyete alongside Noli de Castro, and on his own program Failon Ngayon sa DZMM. He also presented Hoy Gising!, the nightly news program TV Patrol from 2004 to 2020, and his own investigative program Failon Ngayon on television.

On August 30, 2020, ABS-CBN management confirmed that Failon decided to part ways with the network. He made his final appearance on TV Patrol and Failon Ngayon sa TeleRadyo on August 31 and was later replaced by Henry Omaga-Diaz as the Main Anchor on October 5, 2020, Karen Davila on October 11, 2021 and Noli de Castro returning to the said newscast for the 3rd time as the 4th main anchor on January 9, 2023.

He currently anchors Ted Failon at DJ Chacha sa Radyo5, a 4-hour news magazine program, from 6 a.m. to 10 a.m. on Radyo5 92.3 True FM with Czarina Marie Balba-Guevara, more popularly known as DJ Chacha.

Awards and nominations

References

External links
 Ted Failon Latest news, photo and video

1962 births
Living people
Colegio de San Juan de Letran alumni
Filipino radio journalists
Filipino television news anchors
Members of the House of Representatives of the Philippines from Leyte (province)
Arellano University alumni
Polytechnic University of the Philippines alumni
People from Ermita
People from Quezon City
People from Tacloban
ABS-CBN personalities
ABS-CBN News and Current Affairs people
TV5 (Philippine TV network) personalities
News5 people